is a passenger railway station  located in the city of   Nishinomiya Hyōgo Prefecture, Japan. It is operated by the private transportation company Hankyu Railway.

Lines

Station layout
The station consists of a single bay platform. Due to the large number of commuters using the station in the mornings, formerly a second platform and a smaller entrance on the east side of the station were used for boarding outgoing trains. Those leaving the train use the main platform. Also because of the large number of students exiting at Kōyōen Station for nearby schools the exit gate is left open allowing those students holding commuter passes to exit without going through the turnstiles.

Adjacent stations

History

The station opened on 1 October 1924.

Passenger statistics
In fiscal 2019, the station was used by an average of 6,723 passengers daily

Surrounding area
Kōyōen Station has access to Mount Kabutoyama.
Nishinomiya Municipal Koyoen Elementary School
Koyo Gakuin High School
Hyogo Prefectural Nishinomiya Kita High School

See also
List of railway stations in Japan

References

External links

 Kōyōen Station information (Hankyu Railway) 

Railway stations in Hyōgo Prefecture
Railway stations in Japan opened in 1924
Stations of Hankyu Railway
Nishinomiya